The men's eight-ball singles tournament at the 2002 Asian Games in Busan took place from 2 October to 3 October at Dongju College Gymnasium.

Schedule
All times are Korea Standard Time (UTC+09:00)

Results

Finals

Top half

Bottom half

References 
2002 Asian Games Official Report, Page 289

External links 
 Official Website

Cue sports at the 2002 Asian Games